Global Connections is a charitable organization acting as a UK network of mission agencies, churches, colleges and support agencies involved in evangelism around the world. Amongst the several hundred organizations and churches that are members of the Global Connections network are many of the most prominent Christian faith-based organizations as well as many major organizations involved in relief and development. 
Global Connections sees encouraging churches to become more involved in global issues, including world mission, as one of its key purposes. As part of this, they seek to provide opportunities for church leaders to engage with the leaders of mission agencies.

Global Connections also endeavors to bring together those who work in similar areas or to direct them to where they can find help on practical, legal or musicological issues. As part of this they organize approximately 20 forums, where members can meet with and learn from those who share similar concerns and can become involved in joint projects and co-operative actions.

History 

The International Missionary Fellowship (IMF) was formed in 1941 when the need for consultation between mission leaders was frequently urgent due to the numerous crises resulting from the World War II. The IMF was primarily a prayer fellowship for interdenominational mission societies. The name was changed to the Fellowship of Interdenominational Missionary Societies (FIMS) in 1946.

In the post-war period, the mission movement in Britain had to adjust to many changes across the world including the end of the colonial era. However, the FIMS lacked the authority and ability to make recommendations and provide guidance for the British mission movement. In 1958 a new agency, the Evangelical Missionary Alliance (EMA) succeeded the FIMS and a central office with part-time staff was established.

The present 

In the year 2000 the organization EMA (Evangelical Missionary Alliance) changed its name to Global Connections and membership was extended to include agencies whose mission focus was primarily the UK and churches involved in mission. This was done in response to continuing changes in the mission world. These included the growing size and development of the church outside the West and the false dichotomy between the West and the developing world. Mission was now from everywhere to everywhere.

The UK itself was now becoming a mission field with mission partners travelling there from other nations. Furthermore, increasing ethnic diversity was changing the face of the UK. At this time many local churches were becoming involved in mission directly. The organization wanted to reflect these profound and diverse changes and to develop the understanding of mission and its variety of expressions.

Associated networks 
In the UK, Global Connections is associated with the Evangelical Alliance. They try to work closely with these two partners on strategic issues relating to mission.

Within Europe, Global Connections are members of the European Evangelical Missionary Alliance, which brings together networks with similar visions from across Europe. Through them, Global Connections has close links to the European Evangelical Alliance, which works in partnership with the EEMA.

At an international level, Global Connections are members of the World Evangelical Alliance Mission Commission. They are also closely linked to the Lausanne movement and provide a link for them within the UK.

Member organizations
 All Nations Christian College
 All Souls Church, Langham Place
 Beacon Light Trust
 Belfast Bible College
 Book Aid International
 Church Pastoral Aid Society

References

External links 

Global Connections  official website
Evangelical Alliance official website

Evangelical parachurch organizations